The Public Services Ombudsman for Wales was established by section 1(1) of the Public Services Ombudsman (Wales) Act 2005.  The Public Services Ombudsman for Wales brings together the jurisdictions of various offices he replaced, namely the Local Government Ombudsman for Wales, the Health Service Ombudsman for Wales, the Welsh Administration Ombudsman and the Social Housing Ombudsman for Wales.

The Ombudsman has a dual role.  Firstly, under the above Act, he investigates complaints by members of the public concerning maladministration, failure in a relevant service or failure to provide a relevant service by any "listed authority" in Wales.  Secondly, under the Local Government Act 2000, he is responsible for policing ethical standards in local authorities.

The Ombudsman is appointed by the Monarch.  The current Ombudsman is Nick Bennett who was appointed in August 2014.

Maladministration and failure of service

The "listed authorities" subject to the Ombudsman's supervision in regard to maladministration or failure of service are:

 The Welsh Government
 Local authorities
 Fire authorities
 Police authorities
 Joint boards of all local authorities in Wales
 National park authorities
 The Countryside Council for Wales
 The Environment Agency
 The Forestry Commissioners
 Regional flood defence committees
 Internal drainage boards
 The Care Council for Wales
 Local health boards
 NHS trusts and special health authorities
 The Wales Centre for Health
 Community health councils
 Various other listed health providers
 Social landlords
 The National Council for Education and Training for Wales
 The Office of Her Majesty’s Chief Inspector of Education and Training in Wales
 The Higher Education Funding Council for Wales
 State school governing bodies in relation to the admission of pupils (and admission and exclusion appeal panels)
 The Arts Council of Wales
 The Sport Wales
 The Wales Tourist Board
 The Welsh Development Agency
 The Welsh Language Board

Ethical Standards and Codes of Conduct

Part of the Ombudsman's role is to investigates complaints that members of local government bodies have behaved wrongly.

The Ombudsman has issued statutory guidance known as Guidance for members of county and county borough councils, fire and rescue authorities and national park authorities, and Guidance from the Public Services Ombudsman for Wales for members of community councils. Each local authority must adopt a Code of Conduct.

The Ombudsman has power to investigate any complaint referred to him.  If he concludes that there is evidence which warrants doing so, he will send a formal report either to the authority’s standards committee or to the Adjudication Panel for Wales. It will be for the authority or the Panel to decide if the code of conduct has been broken and if so, what penalty to impose on the member concerned. The maximum penalty the Panel may impose is five years’ disqualification from office.

Those who are subject to such supervision are the following types of authority in Wales and the members of any of them:

 Community council
 County or County Borough Council
 Fire authority
 Police authority
 National park authority

See also
 Standards Board for England
 Adjudication Panel for England
 Northern Ireland Ombudsman
 Standards Commission for Scotland
 Ethical Standards in Public Life etc. (Scotland) Act 2000

References

External links
 Public Services Ombudsman for Wales – Official website
 Northern Ireland Ombudsman
Standards Commission for Scotland
Coverage on a UK law wiki
Guardian news article – How to set the highest standards locally

Local government in Wales
Welsh Government
Ombudsmen in Wales